"Belle" is a song written by composer Alan Menken and lyricist Howard Ashman for Walt Disney Pictures' 30th animated feature film Beauty and the Beast (1991). Originally recorded by American actress and singer Paige O'Hara and American actor Richard White, "Belle", a mid-tempo French and classical music-inspired song, incorporates both Broadway and musical theatre elements. The film's first song and opening number, "Belle" appears during Beauty and the Beast as a large scale operetta-style production number that introduces the film's heroine Belle, considered a book-loving nonconformist by the townspeople of the village, who has grown weary of the provincial life in which she is supposed to live, and Gaston, the film's narcissistic villain who wishes to desire her hand in marriage despite Belle's repeated rejections.

"Belle" has been universally acclaimed by film and music critics. Musically, the song has been compared to various musical numbers from the musical films West Side Story (1961) and The Sound of Music (1965), as well as the Broadway musicals Fiddler on the Roof and She Loves Me. At the 64th Academy Awards in 1992, "Belle" was nominated for the Academy Award for Best Original Song, but ultimately lost to the film's title song. The song was similarly featured in the Broadway musical based on the film, originally performed by American actress and singer Susan Egan.

Background

History and writing

In an attempt to replicate the unprecedented success of The Little Mermaid (1989), Walt Disney Animation Studios decided to adapt the traditional fairy tale "Beauty and the Beast" into an animated feature film. Although originally conceived as an animated film with "no songs in it whatsoever" under the direction of Richard Purdum, Disney CEO Jeffrey Katzenberg was unsatisfied with the dark and somber direction in which the film was headed, and ultimately ordered that it be re-written as a "Broadway-style musical with a strong heroine" instead, similar in concept to The Little Mermaid. Disney then hired lyricist Howard Ashman and composer Alan Menken to write the film's songs and assist in the "transform[ing of] Beauty and the Beast into a musical", the pair having just recently collaborated on scoring The Little Mermaid.

According to Menken, the "plot-furthering songs" in Beauty and the Beast, including "Belle", developed quite naturally as a result of the fact that the film was written to "almost ... exist as a stage musical", having been "presented in the style of a traditional Broadway musical." According to Broadway actress and singer Paige O'Hara, who both recorded the song and provided the voice of Belle, Ashman and Menken "wanted to leave the pop music sound of Mermaid behind and go for something more Jerome Kern/Rodgers & Hammerstein" for Beauty and the Beast. The film's songs and musical numbers, which were written to both "propel the plot" and offer "character development", were heavily influenced by French, classical and traditional Broadway music. Additionally, Menken described "Belle" and the other Beauty and the Beast songs to The New York Times as "tangents from 18th-century France".

Written in a style that Menken would later admit is very "distant from contemporary pop", the songwriters were initially skeptical of "Belle", fearful of the song's potential to "end their careers at Disney" if it was not well received. Described by the film's producer Don Hahn as a "Gilbert & Sullivan operetta style" song, "Belle" reveals a lot of information "in a very short time". Ashman and Menken initially doubted that the filmmakers would appreciate their very theatrical approach to animation. Much to their surprise, "Belle" was ultimately very well-liked and "adored by the [creative] team", becoming one of the film's few songs to remain unmodified during production.

Context and composition 

Hoping to write a song that would successfully "portray [Belle] in a world that is so protected and safe", Ashman and Menken drew inspiration from a story-telling style that is often reserved for traditional operettas. As Beauty and the Beasts opening number, "Belle", a "pivotal moment...in the narrative", plays a significant role in the film by introducing both the film's heroine, Belle, after whom the song is named, and Gaston, the film's villain. While Belle, a book-loving and intelligent nonconformist who has grown frustrated with her predictable village life, longs for an adventure similar to the ones she reads about in her books, Gaston is a narcissistic hunter who seeks her hand in marriage. In roughly five minutes, the song explains both Belle and Gaston's roles in Beauty and the Beast to the audience. The song also voices the opinions of the townsfolk and "sets up the overall theme and foreshadows what makes the town so oppressive to [Belle]";  while the villagers award Belle high praise for her doubtless Beauty, they see her as odd because of her love of books and ridicule her for her non-conformity. However, they appraise Gaston for his looks and masculinity.

According to Irving Tan of Sputnikmusic, "Belle" is an "idyllic, orchestra-driven" musical number, written in the style of a traditional operetta. The song begins slowly with Belle performing a down-tempo solo about a typical morning in her village before several other villagers and patrons join her when she sings "bonjour." After this, "Belle" adopts a faster pace, becoming a "rhythmically driven tune" several patrons perform at various times throughout the musical number. Eventually, the song features a counter melody performed by Belle, who lovingly recalls a story she is reading about a beautiful young woman and a handsome prince, followed by Gaston performing the faster melody joined by the Bimbettes, who fawn over the character. Finally, in a Broadway-style climax, the song concludes with virtually every villager singing together. Commonly regarded as the film's "I Want" song,  "Belle" offers its protagonist an opportunity to "expresses her yearnings". Described by Filmtracks.com as a "snare-tapping song", "Belle" is, according to sheet music originally published by Walt Disney Music Publishing, a Broadway-inspired and musical theatre-influenced song, performed at a moderate "pastorally" tempo of 80 beats per minute in the key of D major. Combined, O'Hara's soprano and White's baritone vocal ranges span approximately two octaves, from the low note of A3, sung by White, to the high note G5, sung by O'Hara. Additionally, actors Alec Murphy, Mary Kay Bergman and Kath Soucie's vocals are also featured on the track. In total, "Belle" runs a length of five minutes and nine seconds.

Reception

Critical response 

"Belle" has garnered widespread acclaim from both film and music critics. Filmtracks.com hailed the song as "among the most satisfying and clever cast pieces in history," worthy of its nomination for the Academy Award for Best Original Song. Additionally, Filmtracks.com similarly lauded the song's reprise, drawing similarities between its own instrumentation and that of the title song from The Sound of Music (1965). Sputnikmusic.com's Irving Tan described the song as "idyllic".

Jennie Punter of The Globe and Mail hailed "Belle" as "one of the most delightful openings of any movie musical". The New York Times Janet Maslin was very enthusiastic about the song, praising the way in which it advances the film's plot, while describing "Belle" as "a spectacular opening number that captures the essence of this film's appeal." Additionally, Maslin drew similarities between "Belle" and some of the songs featured in the musical film West Side Story (1961). Beliefnet called the song a "joyous introductory". Pete Vonder Haar of the Houston Press liked both the song and its reprise, admitting to the inevitability of having to experience an "unexpected swell of emotion" when both songs are heard. Highlighting the song as one of the film's most  notable, Sandie Angulo Chen described "Belle" as an "infectious" song "that reveals how different Belle is from the other Disney heroines". While describing the song as a "teeming ... opener", TV Guide positively compared "Belle" to some of the songs featured in the musicals Fiddler on the Roof and She Loves Me. James Berardinelli of ReelViews described "Belle" as "the animated equivalent of Broadway show-stoppers, with all the energy and audacity of something choreographed by Busby Berkeley." Similarly, the New York Posts Lou Lumenick also hailed "Belle" as a "show-stopper".

Ranking Beauty and the Beast Disney's third greatest animated film while hailing it as "the best Disney movie musical," Gregory Ellwood of HitFix wrote, "you can't argue the cinematic joy in numbers such as the opening 'Belle'." Ranking Beauty and the Beast the "Best Disney Soundtrack ... of the Past 25 Years", Moviefone's Sandie Angulo Chen highlighted "Belle", commenting, "There's an infectious quality to all of the Alan Menken and Howard Ashman songs, like the opening number of 'Belle' (that reveals how different Belle is from the other Disney heroines)."

Accolades and legacy 
Alongside "Be Our Guest" and "Beauty and the Beast", "Belle" was one of the three Beauty and the Beast songs that received an Academy Award nomination for Best Original Song at the 64th Academy Awards in 1992. "Belle" ultimately lost to the film's title and theme song. According to producer Don Hahn, Disney was actually hoping that the award would go to "Beauty and the Beast" and promoted the song heavily, spending significantly less money and attention on "Belle". Oh No They Didn't ranked "Belle" at number twenty in its article "The Top 25 Disney Songs of All Time".

"Belle" is often considered one of Disney's most underrated songs. In 2014, the New York Post included the song among "The best (and the most underrated) Disney songs," with author Gregory E. Miller deeming it "a musical-theater classic."

"Belle" is heavily parodied in the animated musical film South Park: Bigger, Longer & Uncut (1999) through its opening number, "Mountain Town". Filmtracks.com described the parody as "a delightful introductory piece". Amy Keating Rogers, a writer working on the animated television series My Little Pony: Friendship Is Magic, mentioned she was influenced by the song as she wrote "Pinkie the Party Planner", the first musical number that appears in the musical-intensive episode "Pinkie Pride".

Live performances and cover versions
O'Hara first performed "Belle" live at the 64th Academy Awards ceremony in 1992, at which it was nominated for Best Original Song. In spite of the fact that the producers of the telecast wanted well-known "pop stars" to perform the song at the ceremony, Disney executives Michael Eisner and Jeffrey Katzenberg were adamant that "Belle" be performed by the original artist by whom it was recorded. The producers also gave O'Hara the option to lip-synch the song. However, she opted to perform it live instead. O'Hara was also forced to wear a rendition of Belle's blue and white costume from the film, of which she was harshly critical because she felt that it was "much too frilly", and Belle is supposed to dress "much simpler." She likened the costume to something that the fairy tale character Little Bo Peep would wear.  O'Hara admitted that she was very nervous before her performance. However, actress Angela Lansbury, who provided the voice of the character Mrs. Potts in the film and was to perform "Beauty and the Beast" at the ceremony, comforted her by telling her, "Paige, if I sang like you I wouldn't be nervous."

In August 2011, O'Hara performed an abridged version of "Belle" live during the Disney Legends awards ceremony, at which O'Hara was also a recipient. The performance was a Beauty and the Beast medley, during which O'Hara musically combined "Belle" with "Beauty and the Beast" and "Be Our Guest".

In the 2017 live-action adaptation, the song is performed by Emma Watson, Luke Evans, and ensemble.

Certifications

References

External links
  (on Disney's official channel)

Songs from Beauty and the Beast (franchise)
Songs about fictional female characters
Disney Renaissance songs
1991 songs
Songs with music by Alan Menken
Songs with lyrics by Howard Ashman
Song recordings produced by Alan Menken
Song recordings produced by Howard Ashman